Thryogenes nereis  is a species of weevil native to Europe.

References

Curculionidae
Beetles described in 1800
Beetles of Europe